Cocksedge is a surname. Notable people with the surname include:

A. G. Cocksedge (1892–1973), British gymnast
Albert Cocksedge (1884–1928), British boxer
Kendra Cocksedge (born 1988), New Zealand rugby union player and cricketer